John Leo Ryan (24 July 1907 – 4 July 1959) was an Australian rules footballer who played with Hawthorn in the Victorian Football League (VFL).

Originally from Carnegie, Ryan played his football at Hawthorn as a rover.

He was Hawthorn's leading goal-kicker in 1931 and 1932, with 39 and 37 goals respectively.

References

External links
 
 

1907 births
Australian rules footballers from Victoria (Australia)
Hawthorn Football Club players
1959 deaths